The men's team pursuit competition at the 2020  UEC European Track Championships was held on 11 November 2020.

Results

Qualifying
All teams advanced to the first round.

First round
First round heats were held as follows:
Heat 1: 1st v 6th fastest
Heat 2: 2nd v 5th fastest
Heat 3: 3rd v 4th fastest

The winners of heats 1 and 2 proceeded to the gold medal race. The winner of heat 3 and the faster loser proceeded to the bronze medal race.

Finals

References

Men's team sprint
European Track Championships – Men's team sprint